The Melos Quartet was a much-recorded, Stuttgart-based string quartet active from 1965 until 2005, when its first violin died. It also went by the name Melos Quartett Stuttgart, partly to distinguish itself from the equally prominent chamber group the Melos Ensemble of London.

Origins and activities 
Melos Quartett Stuttgart was founded in October 1965 by four young members of well-known German chamber orchestras. The name Melos, an ancient Greek word for singing, and the root of the word melody, was suggested by the combination of the names Melcher and Voss, to indicate their purpose as distinct individuals seeking musical harmony together. Leader Melcher of Hamburg studied with Erich Röhn and with both Pina Carmirelli and Arrigo Pelliccia of the Boccherini Quintet in Rome. He won the International Chamber Music Competition in Venice in 1962 and became concertmaster of the Hamburg Symphony Orchestra the next year. The Voss brothers are Rhinelanders. They studied with Sandor Végh, and Hermann continued as a pupil of Ulrich Koch, becoming solo violist of the Stuttgart Chamber Orchestra. Cellist Buck is a Swabian who studied in Düsseldorf and Freiburg and with Ludwig Hoelscher in Stuttgart. Gerhard Voss and Buck were members of the Württemberg Chamber Orchestra.

In 1966 the group gave its first recital, won a prize in the Villa-Lobos-Quartet competition in Rio de Janeiro, represented West Germany at the World Congress of Jeuness Musicale in Paris, and, most influentially for their future success, won the Prix américain as the best quartet at the Geneva International Congress of Musical Performance. 

Then, giving up their orchestral positions to concentrate solely on the Quartet, they began touring in 1967 and in 1968 performed in seven European countries. In 1969 they gave 105 concerts throughout the world, and had their first television appearance.

Contract with Deutsche Grammophon
In 1969 the group signed a five-year contract with the D.G.G. record company, and spent 25 days that year making recordings for radio and commercial release. They obtained the first prize of the String Quartet Foundation sponsored by German industry in 1970, and in 1972 they entered into a further contract with D.G.G. for complete recordings of the Schubert and Cherubini string quartets.

After this they undertook tours around the world, in North and South America, Africa, all European countries, the Near East and Far East, getting as far as Novosibirsk in Russia. They became the first West German musicians to play in Volgograd (Stalingrad), in 1973, in concerts commemorating the events of 1943. By 1975, when the Schubert integral recordings were completed and issued, the Quartet also held a teaching post at the Stuttgart School of Music.

By 1975 the group had built up a repertoire of 120 works, including the complete Beethoven, Schubert, Cherubini, Mendelssohn, Schumann, Brahms, Janáček quartets, and works by Haydn, Mozart, Hugo Wolf, Pfitzner, Verdi, Donizetti, Debussy, Smetana, Kodály, Hindemith, Bartók, Alban Berg, Gian Francesco Malipiero, Witold Lutosławski, Milko Kelemen, Robert Wittinger and Josef Maria Horváth. They made a conscious decision to have a wide-ranging repertoire in order to avoid getting stuck to any particular period.

For most of the Schubert recordings the instruments were a cello by Francesco Ruggieri (1682), a viola by Carlo Ferdinando Landolfi (18th century), first violin by Domenico Montagnana (1731) and second violin by Carlo Annibale Tononi (18th century).

They were planning a farewell tour in 2005, when Wilhelm Melcher, the first violinist died unexpectedly just before his 65th birthday.

Among others, the Quartet collaborated with Arthur Rubinstein, Mstislav Rostropovich, Georg Solti, Narciso Yepes, Piero Farulli and Dietrich Fischer-Dieskau.

Members
The membership was unusually stable:

 Wilhelm Melcher (1940–2005), violin I
 Gerhard Voss (b.1939), from 1965 to 1993 violin II
 Ida Bieler (b.1958), from 1993 to 2005 violin II
 Hermann Voss (b.1934), viola
 Peter Buck (b.1937), cello

Recordings
Among others, they recorded a performance of the Schubert String Quintet with Mstislav Rostropovich as second cellist on the Deutsche Grammophon label. 
They recorded a 5-LP set of Mozart's 10 Great String Quartets, the complete Mendelssohn, Schumann, Brahms, Janáček, Cherubini and Schubert String Quartets and the complete Beethoven Quartet Cycle twice: in 1970 for Intercord and in 1984/85 for DGG label.  With violists Franz Beyer and Piero Farulli, they recorded Mozart's complete String Quintets, again for the yellow label.

Complete discography, LPs & CDs (listed by Composer)
 BARTOK – String Quartet No.3 (LP – DGG 139 450 | (p)1970 + KODALY + WEINER)
 BEETHOVEN – Die frühen Streichquartette: Op.18 No.1-6 (‘1st recording’ | 3LP – Intercord 185.750 | rec: 1970)
 BEETHOVEN – Die mittleren Streichquartette: Op.59 Nos.1–3 / Op.74 / Op.95 (‘1st recording’ | 4LP – Intercord 185.751 | rec: 1970)
 BEETHOVEN – Die späten Streichquartette: Op.127 / Opp.130-131-132 + Op.130: alternative Finale / Great Fugue Op.133 / Op.135 / Op.14 No.1 (‘1st recording’ | 5LP – Intercord 185.752 | rec: 1970)
 BEETHOVEN – Die frühen Streichquartette: Op.18 No.1-6 (‘2nd recording’ | 3CD – DGG 410971 | rec: 6/1983 | (p)1984)
 BEETHOVEN – Die mittleren Streichquartette: Op.14 No.1 / Op.59 Nos.1–3 / Op.74 / Op.95 (‘2nd recording’ | 3CD – DGG 415342 | rec: 1984 | (p)1985)
 BEETHOVEN – Die späten Streichquartette: Op.127 / Opp.130-131-132 / Great Fugue Op.133 / Op.135 (‘2nd recording’ | 3CD – DGG 415676 | rec: 12/1984; 5/1985 (op.130–132) | (p)1986 ) 
 BOCCHERINI – Quintets for Guitar and Strings: No.4 in D G.448 "Fandango" / No.9 in C, G.453 -"La ritirata di Madrid" / No.7 in E minor, G.451 (Narciso Yepes, guitar; CD – DGG 4777112 | rec: 3/1970 | (p)1971)
 BRAHMS – Complete String Quartets: No.1 in C minor, Op.51/1 / No.2 in A minor, Op.51/2 / No.3 in B-flat major, Op.67 (3CD – DGG 423670 | rec: 5/1986 & 6/1987 | (p)1988 + SCHUMANN)
 BRAHMS – String Quintet No.2 in G major, Op.111 / Clarinet Quintet in B minor, Op.115 (Gérard Caussé, 2nd viola / Michel Portal, clarinet; CD – Harmonia Mundi 1951349)
 BRUCKNER – String Quintet in F major, WAB.112 / (Enrique Santiago, 2nd viola; 2LP – Intercord, 1975 + JANACEK #2 + SMETANA #2 + WOLF)
 BRUCKNER – Intermezzo, in D minor, WAB.113 (Enrique Santiago, 2nd viola; CD – Harmonia Mundi 1951421, rec: May 1992 + Quintet)
 CHERUBINI – Complete String Quartets: No.1, in E flat major (1814) / No.2, in C major (1829) / No.3, in D minor (1834) / No.4, in E major (1835) / No.5, in F major (1835) / No.6, in A minor (1837) | (3CD – DGG 429185-2 | rec: 6/1973 [1 & 2]; 4/1974 [5]; 10/1974 [3]; 2/1975 [4 & 6] )
 DEBUSSY – String Quartet in G minor, Op.10, L.85 (LP – DGG 419750, + RAVEL | rec: 2/1979 (p)1979; reprint: CD – DGG 4790529, + RAVEL + KODALY)
 DVORAK – String Quartet No.14 in A-flat major, Op.105/B.193 / String Quartet No.13 in G major, Op.106/B.192 (w. Ida Bieler, 2nd violin | CD – Harmonia Mundi HMC 901709, 2001)
 DVORAK – String Quartet No.9 in D minor, Op.34/B.75 / Piano Quintet in A major, Op.81/B.155 / String Quintet No.3 (w. 2nd viola) in E flat major "American", Op.97/B.180  / String Quartet No.12 in F major "American", Op.96/B.179 (w. Ida Bieler, 2nd violin; Karl Engel, piano; Gérard Caussé, 2nd viola | 2CD – Harmonia Mundi HMC 901671, 1995)
 HAYDN – Famous String Quartets: No.62 in C major "Emperor", Op.76/3, Hob.III:77 / No.63 in B-flat major "Sunrise", Op.76/4, Hob.III:78 / No.32 in C major "Bird", Op.33/3, Hob.III:39 / No.27 in D major "Sun", Op.20/4, Hob.III:34 (2LP – Intercord 885.906, 1976 | reprint: 2CD Intercord 885.906 | 1CD --Nos.62, 63 & 32 only-- EMI, 1988)
 JANACEK – String Quartet No.2 "Intimate Letters", JW.7/13 (2LP – Intercord, 1973 + SMETANA #2, BRUCKNER, WOLF)
 JANACEK – Complete String Quartets:  No.1 "Kreutzer Sonata", JW.7/8 / No.2 "Intimate Letters", JW.7/13 (CD – Harmonia Mundi, 1992)
 KELEMEN – "Sonnets" [1987] for String Quartet (CD – BIS 742; rec: 17/2/1988)
 KODALY – String Quartet No.2, Op.10 (LP – DGG 139.450 | (p)1970 + BARTOK + WEINER | reprint: CD – DGG 4790.529 + RAVEL + DEBUSSY)
 MENDELSSOHN – Complete String Quartets: No.0, in E flat major oh.op. / No.1 in E flat major, Op.12 / No.2, in A minor, Op.13 / No.3, in D, Op.44/1 / No.4, in E minor, Op.44/2 / No.5, in E flat major, Op.44/3 / No.6, in F minor, Op.80 / Four Pieces for String Quartet, Op.81 (3CD – DGG 4158832)
 MOZART Hoffmeister & 3 Prussian-Quartets: No.20, in D Major "Hoffmeister" K.499 / No.21, in D Major K.575 / No.22, in B-flat major K.589 / No.23, in F major K.590 (‘1st recording’ 1974 | 2LP - Intercord 29722-6 Z/1-2 | no CD reprint)
 MOZART Die 10 großen Streichquartette (rec: 1977–1984 | 5LP – DGG 415 587-1 (p)1985 | reprint: 4CD – Tower Records -Japanese Edition- PROC-2992/5 (p)2017)
 6 Haydn-Quartets: No.14, in G major K.387 "Spring" / No.15, in D minor K.421 (417b) / No.16, in E-flat major K.428 (421b) / No.17, in B-flat major K.458 "Hunt" / No.18, in A major K.464 / No.19, in C major K.465 "Dissonance" (rec: 1977 [# 14-17] & 1978 [# 18-19] | reprint: 3CD DGG 415 870)
 Hoffmeister & 3 Prussian-Quartets: No.20, in D Major "Hoffmeister" K.499 / No.21, in D Major K.575 / No.22, in B-flat major K.589 / No.23, in F major K.590 (‘2nd recording’ 1984 [# 20-21] & 1981 [# 22-23] | reprint: 2CD DGG 2531 320)
 MOZART – Clarinet Quintet in A major "Stadler", K.581 / String Quartet No.20, in D Major "Hoffmeister" K.499 / Fugues (5) for String Quartet (transcribed from Bach WTC Book II: Nos. 2,5,7,8,9) K.405 (Julia Rayson, clarinet | rec.1974 | LP Intercord 29731-7 K | CD reprint: EMI 5725662 (p)1997)
 MOZART – Piano Quartets: No.1 in G minor, K.478 / No.2 in E flat major, K.493 (Georg Solti, piano | CD – Decca 417190 / reprint: Decca Eloquence 4428221 | rec: 6/1984 & 6/1985 | (p)1986)
 MOZART – Complete String Quintets: No.1 in B flat major, K.174 / No.2 in C minor, K.406 (516b) / No.3 in C major, K.515 / No.4 in G minor, K.516 / No.5 in D major, K.593 / No.6 in E-flat major, K.614 (Franz Beyer (# 1–4) & Piero Farulli (# 5–6), 2nd viola | 3CD – DGG | rec: 1987/1991)
 Hans Georg PFLÜGER – String Quartet [1984] (CD – Bayer-Records 100040)
 RAVEL – String Quartet in F major, M.35 (LP – DGG 419750 + DEBUSSY | rec: 2/1979 (p)1979; reprint: CD – DGG 4790529, + DEBUSSY + KODALY)
 SCHUBERT – Complete String Quartets: No.1, D.18 / No.2, in C major D.32 / No.3, in B flat major D.36 / No.4, in C major D.46 / No.5, in B flat major D.68 / No.6, in D major D.74 / No.7, in D major D.94 / Quartet Movement, in C minor D.103 / No.8, in B flat major D.112 (Op.Post.168) / No.9, in G minor D.173 / No.10, in E flat D.87 / No.11, in E major D.353 (op.post.125 No.2) / No.12, in C minor D.703 "Quartettsatz" / No.13, in A minor D.804 "Rosamunde" / No.14, in D minor D.810 "Death and the Maiden" / No.15, in G D.887 (6CD – DGG 4631512 | rec: 1971–75)
 SCHUBERT – The Late String Quartets: “Quartettsatz” (No.12) in C minor, D.703 / No.13, in A minor D.804 "Rosamunde" / No.14, in D minor D.810 "Death and the Maiden" / No.15, in G major D.887 (‘2nd rec.1991’ | 2CD - Harmonia Mundi HMA 901.408/09 (p)1991)
 SCHUBERT – String Quintet in C major, D.956 (Mstislav Rostropovich, 2nd cello; CD – DGG 4776357)
 SCHUBERT – String Quintet in C major, D.956 (w. Ida Bieler, 2nd violin / Wolfgang Boettcher, 2nd cello; CD – Harmonia Mundi | rec: 10/1993 | (p)1994)
 SCHUMANN – Complete String Quartets: No.1 in A minor, Op.41/1 / No.2 in F major, Op.41/2 / No.3 in A major, Op.41/3  (3CD – DGG 423670 | rec: 5/1986 & 6/1987 | (p)1988 + BRAHMS)
 SIBELIUS – String Quartet in D minor, Op.56 “Voces intimae” (w. Ida Bieler, 2nd violin; CD – Harmonia Mundi 901671, 1995 + VERDI)
 SMETANA – String Quartet No.2, in E minor "From my Life" (2LP – Intercord, 1973; + JANACEK 2 + BRUCKNER + WOLF)
 VERDI – String Quartet in E minor (w. Ida Bieler, 2nd violin; CD – Harmonia Mundi, 1995 + SIBELIUS)
 WEINER – String Quartet No.3, Op.26 (LP – DGG 139 450 | (p)1970 + BARTOK & KODALY | no CD reprint)
 WOLF – “Italian Serenade” in G minor, for String Quartet (2LP – Intercord, 1975; + JANACEK #2 + SMETANA #2 + BRUCKNER)
 Melos-Quartett Live 1979: HAYDN String Quartet No.64, in D major Op.76 No.5/Hob.III:79 "Erdödy" / FORTNER String Quartet No.4 (1975) / RAVEL String Quartet in F major, M.35 (CD – Hänssler Classic 93716)

References 

Musical groups established in 1965
German string quartets
German musical groups
Musical groups disestablished in 2005